Niki Chow (周勵淇, previously 周麗淇; born August 30, 1979) is a Hong Kong actress and singer.

Early life
Chow was born and raised in Hong Kong. She is fluent in Mandarin. However, netizens have pointed that her Cantonese pronunciation is less than perfect. This is because she grew up speaking Shanghainese in her family. She is the younger sister of the Hong Kong model Kathy Chow. Niki's school life ended when she was spotted by an agent who offered her a modeling opportunity. This was the beginning of her life as an artist. She was just about 17 years old at that time.

Acting career
Several years later, she began her acting career in movies and television series, working mostly with TVB. Cast by Amy Wong, her first TVB series was Hard Fate. She is well known for her role and performance in Producer Lau Ka Ho's 2005 series The Gentle Crackdown, which stars Moses Chan and her. She won the Most Improved Actress award at the TVB Anniversary Awards (2005) for her performance in The Gentle Crackdown. Amy Wong's Under the Canopy of Love, starring Kevin Cheng, Bosco Wong and her, in the February of the following year also helped establish her popularity. An indirect sequel with the same cast and crew, The Seventh Day, came out February 2008. Her on-screen partnership with Kevin Cheng was well received by the audience in the years 2004–2008, along with rumours of the two dating in real life (until 2008). Her other series include The King of Snooker in 2009, with Adam Cheng and Patrick Tang. She filmed Sakura Memories (櫻紅醉), a travel documentary programme on Japan, in the spring of 2009 which aired on TVB in August 2009.

Music career
Niki signed with BMA Records in 2005 and released her debut EP Pure Niki in the August of that year. In 2006, she released Child-Woman and a single Nikikaka. In January 2009, she released Redefine. In August 2010, she released a charity single Make a Wish with proceeds donated to an organization called Make-A-Wish Hong Kong. As well, in November 2010, she released her last EP under BMA Records: F.L.Y. (which stands for Freedom, Love, and Youth).

Writing career
She is also the author of several books, including Girlfriend Diary (周麗淇·女朋友手記; 2005), a book of the same title as her 2006 album The Child Woman (2006), Detailed Little Things (細味心事; 2007), Happiness (幸福; 2009), and Cherish (珍惜; 2010). Her books are published under BMA Publications.

Discography

Studio albums

Soundtrack
 明知不知傻痴痴 (theme song for The Gentle Crackdown (2005), a duet with co-star Moses Chan)
 請講 (theme song for Under the Canopy of Love (2006), a duet with co-star Kevin Cheng)
 抱著空氣 (sub theme for The Seventh Day (2008), a duet with co-star Kevin Cheng)
 相信童話 (sub theme for The King of Snooker (2009), a duet with co-star Patrick Tang)
 身在福中 (theme song for her TVB travel programme Sakura Memories (2009))
 心變 (theme song for A Change Of Heart 2013)

Filmography

Television series

Film

Awards and nominations

References

External links 
 Weibo
 Karazen: Niki Chow Album Reviews & Chinese Lyrics
 Niki Chow 's pinkwork creation (p1 ~4.htm, sound & video)
 Niki Chow old interview (p1 ~2.htm, sound & video)

1979 births
21st-century Hong Kong actresses
Hong Kong film actresses
Hong Kong television actresses
Living people
TVB veteran actors
HIV/AIDS activists
21st-century Hong Kong women singers
Hong Kong idols